Licentiate may refer to:

Licentiate (degree), a degree below a PhD granted by universities in some countries; may indicate a medical doctor qualification in the UK and other countries.

Religion
Licentiate of Canon Law, Roman Catholic Church
Licentiate of the Church of Scotland
Licentiate of Sacred Theology, Roman Catholic Church
Licentiate of Theology, awarded to ordinands and laymen theology scholars in the United Kingdom and some Commonwealth countries

Science and medicine
Licentiate of Dental Surgery, in many countries worldwide
Licentiate of the Medical Council of Canada, a required certification prior to obtaining a licence to practice medicine
Licentiate of the Medical Council of Hong Kong, a medical license required of non-local graduates for eligibility to register to practice medicine
Licentiate of the Royal College of Physicians, in the UK, a former qualification mostly replaced by the Diploma of Membership of the RCP
Licentiate of the Society of Apothecaries, in the UK, a former qualification for medical doctors in some areas, as well as midwives, dispensaries (pharmacists), etc.
Medical Licentiate Society of Hong Kong, a non-profit professional association of doctors trained outside of Hong Kong holding said qualification

Other
Licentiate in Music, Australia
Licentiate of the Commonwealth Institute of Accountants
Licentiate of the Royal British Institute of Architects